The horned woodlizard or Boulenger's dwarf iguana (Enyalioides palpebralis) is a species of reptile in the genus Enyalioides, native to northern Bolivia, western Brazil and eastern Peru.

References

Enyalioides] 
Lizards of South America
Reptiles of Bolivia
Reptiles of Brazil
Reptiles of Peru
Reptiles described in 1883
Taxa named by George Albert Boulenger